Czerna  (Nazi-German: Hammerfeld; until 1936: Tschirndorf) is a village in the administrative district of Gmina Iłowa, within Żagań County, Lubusz Voivodeship, in western Poland.

The village has a population of 360.

References

Villages in Żagań County